Albert Bythesea Weigall CMG, (16 February 1840 – 20 February 1912) was an English-born Australian schoolmaster, headmaster of Sydney Grammar School for 45 years.

Early life
Weigall was the fourth son of the Rev. Edward Weigall by his wife, Cecelia Bythesea Brome and was educated at Macclesfield Grammar School and Brasenose College, Oxford. He received second class honours in Literae Humaniores in 1862, and the following year travelled to Australia after a sea voyage was recommended for him to recover from illness.

Career
Weigall settled in Melbourne, teaching primarily classics at Scotch College, Melbourne under Alexander Morrison for three years. His cousin Theyre Weigall was able to introduce him to some influential friends, and in 1866 he applied for the position of headmaster at Sydney Grammar School, took up the role in January 1867.

At the beginning of the 1867 academic year there were only 53 boys at Sydney Grammar; this grew to 696 boys in Weigall's last year as headmaster. Indeed, when he arrived the school was in a particularly perilous situation, as the previous headmaster William Stephens departed after a conflict over corporal punishment with the school trustees. He had left to form a new school at Darlinghurst, taking fifty students with him.

Weigall sought to rebuild the school by instilling the value of academic achievement, as well as build character through sporting activities. He introduced the school magazine The Sydneian, and a prefect system in 1878. Weigall guided the school's teachers, some of whom had arrived from England after being educated at the great public schools there, to impart a similar atmosphere at Sydney Grammar School. For example, he and Henry Anderson formed the school cadet corps in 1870, and the following year Weigall became captain of the corps.

Late life and legacy
Weigall's interest almost exclusively lay with his role as Headmaster of Sydney Grammar School. He finally took a year off in 1893, and although he later returned and would remain headmaster until his death, he was plagued by illness in the latter part of his life. He died on 20 February 1912. He was lauded by past students and the school trustees for his leadership. The land the school had purchased in 1907 at Rushcutters Bay was named the Weigall Playing Fields; Weigall had strongly advocated for sporting grounds for the students of the school.

He was married to Ada Frances Raymond in 1868, and had four sons and four daughters. Among them was Cecil Weigall, a prominent barrister.

References

Mangan, James Anthony, and Nauright, John (2000). "Making Middle-Class Men in the Australian Public Schools". Sport in Australasian Society: Past and Present. Sydney: Routledge. 
Cliff Turney, 'Stephens, William John (1829 - 1890)', Australian Dictionary of Biography, Volume 6, MUP, 1976, pp 375–376
J. B. Windeyer, 'Weigall, Albert Bythesea (1840 - 1912)', Australian Dictionary of Biography, Volume 6, MUP, 1976, pp 197–198

1840 births
1912 deaths
British emigrants to Australia
Australian headmasters
Sydney Grammar School headmasters